Bisognin is an Italian surname. Notable people with the name include:

Marzia Bisognin (born 1992), Italian writer, fashion designer, businesswoman, and internet personality
Vitoria Bisognin (born 1992), Brazilian model and beauty queen

Italian-language surnames